Tosatrochus attenuatus is a species of sea snail, a marine gastropod mollusk in the family Trochidae, the top snails.

Description
The height of the shell varies between 25 mm and 30 mm. The thick, imperforate or very narrowly perforate shell has a conic-elongated shape. It is whitish, ornamented with radiating livid-brown flammules, brown punctulate. The 9 whorls are convex, spirally lirate (the lirae unequal) and longitudinally nodose-costate, the nodules more prominent below. The sutures are impressed. The angulated body whorl is depressed beneath the sutures and nodulous at the periphery. It is very convex and with about 8 concentric lirae beneath, the interstices with intercalated lirulae. The aperture is subquadrate and canaliculate within. The basal margin is arcuate and plicate. The columella is subangular, concave, strongly truncate at base, with a short callus over the umbilicus.

Distribution
This marine species occurs off the South Australia, Western Australia and the Western Pacific.

References

 Wood, Ind. Test. Suppl. pi. 5. f. 19
 Kuroda T. & Habe T. 1952. Check list and bibliography of the Recent marine Mollusca of Japan. Leo W. Stach, Tokyo. 210 pp
 Poppe G.T., Tagaro S.P. & Dekker H. (2006) The Seguenziidae, Chilodontidae, Trochidae, Calliostomatidae and Solariellidae of the Philippine Islands. Visaya Supplement 2: 1-228.

External links
 The PIisbry Quarterly Devoted to the Interests of Conchologists; The Nautilus v.72 (1958-1959)
 Jonas, J. H. (1844). Neue Trochoideen. Zeitschrift für Malakozoologie. 1: 167-172
 Wood, W. (1828). Supplement to the Index Testaceologicus; or A catalogue of Shells, British and Foreign. Richard Taylor, London. Iv [+1 + 59 pp., plates 1-8]

attenuatus
Gastropods described in 1844